The 12th Territorial Defence Brigade is a military unit of the Territorial Defence Force of the Polish Armed Forces. The brigade is based in Poznań, Greater Poland Voivodeship.

Organisation 
 12th Greater Poland Territorial Defence Brigade command — Poznań
 121st Light Infantry Battalion — Poznań (Ławica)
 122nd Light Infantry Battalion — Dolaszewo
 123rd Light Infantry Battalion — Turek, Poland
 124th Light Infantry Battalion — Śrem
 125th Light Infantry Battalion — Leszno

Command 
 Colonel Rafał Miernik

References 

Army brigades of Poland
Military units and formations established in 2018
2018 establishments in Poland